Mar Athanasius College of Engineering (MACE) is a  government aided engineering college located in Kothamangalam, Kerala state, India. The college is affiliated to the APJ Abdul Kalam Technological University since its inception in 2015.

One of the five oldest engineering colleges in Kerala and one among the three gov-aided colleges , MACE was established in 1961 under Mar Athanasius College Association, and is approved by the AICTE. The college has six departments and two auxiliary departments (Mathematics and Humanities & Science). MACE has nearly 150 faculty, 3,000 students and 150 administrative and supporting staff.

The college provides Bachelor of Technology programs (Civil, Mechanical, Electrical, Electronics and Communication, Computer Science, Artificial Intelligence, Data Science), Master of Technology programs, Master of Computer Applications (MCA) and PhD programs. Students are admitted to the various programs from the rank lists published by the state/central Government (KEAM, DTE, GATE).

The college conducts a techfest called 'Takshak' and an arts and culture fest called 'Sanskriti'. The students of MACE are generally referred as MACEians. Student level technical clubs are very active in MACE. IEEE and ASME students have gained global level recognitions.

Beautiful campus of MACE occupies over 62 acres of land and is equipped with sports facilities of international standards. 50 meters swimming pool is a unique facility among them. MACE campus is located 1 kilometer from the Kothamangalam city, 32 kilometers from Aluva (AWY) railway station and 36 kilometers from Cochin International airport (COK).

Governance
The Institution is the second venture of the Mar Athanasius College Association, the first being the arts and science college started in 1955. The Association also has Mar Athanasius International School and Mar Baselious College, Adimali, to its credit. Prof. M P Varghese had been at the reins from the time of founding.

There is a governing body separately for MACE consisting of representatives of the All India Council for Technical Education, the State Government, Mahatma Gandhi University, APJ Abdul Kalam Technological University, and Mar Athanasius College Association.

Academic programs

Bachelor of Technology (B.Tech)
Candidates for admission to the B.Tech. Degree course shall be required to have passed the higher secondary/+2/XII Std. examination conducted by boards/departments recognized/accepted by the university, obtaining not less than 50% marks in Mathematics and not less than 50% marks in Mathematics, Physics and Chemistry put together or the diploma examination in Engineering, Kerala or any examination accepted by the government of Kerala as equivalent there to with 50% marks in the final qualifying examination, subject to the usual concession allowed for backward and other communities as specified from time to time. The college has the best accredited Mechanical engineering department in the entire state. Only the top five percentile in the Kerala Engineering Entrance Exam are able to secure a seat. The course takes a duration of 4 years with 8 semesters and it is approved by the Indian AICTE.

Seats
Civil Engineering - 120
Mechanical Engineering - 120
Electrical & Electronics Engineering - 120
Electronics & Communication Engineering - 120
Computer Science and Engineering - 60
Data Science - 60
Artificial intelligence and Machine learning - 60

Master of Technology (M.Tech)

Seats

Computer Science and Engineering (Computer Science) - 18
Computer Aided Structural Engineering (Civil) - 18
Production & Industrial Engineering (Mechanical) - 18
Power Electronics (Electrical& Electronics) - 18
VLSI (Electronics and Communication) - 18
Thermal Power Engineering (Mechanical) - 24

Master of Computer Applications (M.C.A.)
The minimum qualification for admission is B.Sc. Comp. Sc, BCA or B.Sc. or B.Com. degree with Mathematics or Statistics as one of the subjects with not less than 55% marks, excluding languages, in the qualifying examination.

Candidates with B.Sc. Comp Sc, BCA, B.Sc/ B.Com. degree of the Mahatma Gandhi University or any other degree, accepted as equivalent there to by the Mahatma Gandhi University are alone eligible to apply.

The intake is 30.

Student life

Sanskriti 
Sanskriti is the annual national level cultural fest of Mar Athanasius College of Engineering Kothamangalam.

Takshak
Takshak is the annual national technical fest of Mar Athanasius College of Engineering Kothamangalam.

IEEE (Institution of Electrical and Electronics Engineers)

IEEE MACE chapter is a very active student club which is gaining global level recognitions consecutively. Darrel Chong student activity award 2022 (Gold), HAC/SIGHT Project 22 ($4,844), IEEE MGA Outstanding Branch Chapter Advisor and IEEE MGA Outstanding Branch Chapter Counselor are few among them received from IEEE international in 2022 for their outstanding performances.

American Society of Mechanical Engineers (ASME MACE)

ASME MACE student club is actively involved in the robotic/mechanical design challenges and is bringing international level recognitions to the MACE community.  Recently ASME MACE achieved Global Rank 6 in extended reality challenge (XRC) and Global Rank 9 in Student Design Competition (SDC) during the Efest 2022 conducted by ASME. https://www.asmemace.in/

Society of Automotive Engineers (SAE MACE)

SAE MACE is a student club which is actively involved in the design and fabrication of automotive. Many of their automobile designs have gained national level recognitions.

Model United Nations (MACE MUN)

The legacy of MACE MUN began in 2014. The MACE MUN’21 was held with great triumph and valour in Mar Athanasius College of Engineering on the 4th and 5 December 2021. Around 137 delegates from various colleges participated in the event. Heated discussions and fiery debates were held in the various committees namely, the Kerala Legislative Assembly (KLA), UNGA- DISEC, and UNHRC and the event was covered by the International Press (IP).

Computer Society of India (CSI MACE)

The CSI MACE is an active association of students with computer science and programming minds. The broad spectrum of members is committed to advancing the theory and practice of Computer Engineering and Technology Systems, Science and Engineering, Information Processing, and related Arts and Sciences.

The MacePost
The MacePost is a student operated newsletter website of the college, managed and maintained entirely by the student community of the college. It was launched on 15 July 2013. It provides information on the activities of the various clubs and departments, as well as news of the alumni.

Since 2017 The Macepost and the Mar Athanasius have managed the annual MACE Model United Nations (MACE MUN) Conference, a two-days international game aimed to build up a blend of diplomacy, debating and display of leadership skills in the context of a reproduction of the UN committees and UN General Assembly. The event has involved around 60 delegates from various years and branches of the college, most of which were participating for the first time.

Sports 

 Swimming Pool (50m)
 Football Ground
 Cricket Ground with Practice Nets
 Indoor and outdoor Badminton Courts
 Basketball courts
 Tennis court
 Volleyball court
 Gymnasium 
 Table Tennis

Student Hostels
Most of the students at MACE are residing at college hostels. Separate hostels are provided for boys and girls and each hostel has attached dining facilities.

Notable alumni
 Dr. S Unnikrishnan Nair - Director, Vikram Sarabhai Space Centre, Thiruvananthapuram
 Murali Thummarukudy - Chief of Disaster Risk Reduction in the UN Environment Programme
 V. K Matthews - Founder chairman IBS software services
 Ranjith Sankar - Malayalam screenwriter and film director
 Arun Alat - Popular Malayalam language singer
 T. G. Ravi - Actor
 Dr. K. Poulose Jacob - Academician, Ex-Pro Vice Chancellor, Cochin University of Science & Technology
 Niranj Suresh - Playback Singer
Thampi Antony - Indian-American film actor, writer, activist and producer

Alumni association

MACE Alumni Association (MACEAA) has nine chapters — seven abroad and two in India. Around 8000 (all old students, final-year students and teaching staff of MACE) are members of MACEAA.

See also
 Mar Athanasius College
 NSS College of Engineering
 Thangal Kunju Musaliar College of Engineering

References

External links
MACE Official Home Page
TAKSHAK SASTHRAMELA
THE MACE POST
Mace 2003 ECE StudentsHome Page
Mace 1995 Alumni Home Page
CEE information
Mar Athanasius College Association Official Facebook Page
Macemoments Instagram page
Macemoments podcast
Macemoments

Christian universities and colleges in India
Engineering colleges in Ernakulam district
Colleges affiliated to Mahatma Gandhi University, Kerala
Educational institutions established in 1961
1961 establishments in Kerala